Diapolia is a monotypic moth genus of the family Erebidae erected by George Hampson in 1926. Its only species, Diapolia magna, was first described by John Henry Leech in 1900. It is found in Sichuan, China.

References

Calpinae
Monotypic moth genera